This is a list of candidates in the 2021 West Bengal Legislative Assembly election.

A total of 2,116 candidates contested 292 seats. The voting in two constituencies had to be postponed to 16 May, after the death of one candidate from each constituency. Voting for said constituencies was postponed again and finally took place on 30 September. A total of 16 candidates contested for these two constituencies.

List of candidates
List of the candidates (constituency wise) of the four main parties/alliance:

Notes

References

2021 West Bengal Legislative Assembly election
West Bangal
2021
2020s in West Bengal